Philip J. McConnaughay (born January 5, 1953, in Geneva, Illinois), is the current dean and professor of law at Peking University School of Transnational Law. Previously, he was the dean and The Donald J. Farage Professor of Law at The Pennsylvania State University's Dickinson School of Law and a professor of law at the University of Illinois College of Law. He was admitted to Illinois bar in 1978; 1979, California; 1983, District of Columbia; 1992–1994, Japan; 1994–1996, Hong Kong.

Education
University of Illinois (B.A. 1975; J.D., 1978)

External links
Faculty Profile, Dean of Peking University School of Transnational Law
Peking University School of Transnational Law

Living people
1953 births
People from Geneva, Illinois
Academic staff of Peking University
University of Illinois College of Law alumni
American legal scholars